Lithol Rubine BK is a reddish synthetic azo dye. It has the appearance of a red powder and magenta when printed.  It is slightly soluble in hot water, insoluble in cold water, and insoluble in ethanol. When dissolved in dimethylformamide, its absorption maximum lies at about 442 nm. It is usually supplied as a calcium salt.  It is prepared by azo coupling with 3-hydroxy-2-naphthoic acid.
It is used to dye plastics, paints, printing inks, and for textile printing. It is normally used as a standard magenta in the three and four color printing processes.

When used as a food dye, it has E number E180. It is used to color cheese rind as well as a component in some lip balms.

References

Azo dyes
Food colorings
Inks
Calcium compounds
Benzenesulfonates
2-Naphthols
Naphthoic acids
E-number additives